Meziad or Mezyad may refer to:
 Mezyad, Al-Ain, a settlement on the UAE-Omani border in Eastern Arabia
 Meziad, a village in the commune Remetea, Bihor County, Romania
 Meziad (river), a river in Bihor County, Romania